Ram Krushna Patnaik (15 August 1940 – 24 December 2021) was an Indian politician. He was the founding member of Biju Janata Dal (BJD) and former cabinet Finance minister of Odisha and elected to the Odisha Legislative Assembly from Kodala, Odisha in the 1977, 1980, 1995 and 2000 as a member of the Janata Party, Janata Dal and Biju Janata Dal. He was the most important nd trusted friend of former Chief Minister Kalinga Vira shree Biju Patnaik.

He was Leader of Opposition in Odisha Legislative Assembly from 1996 to 1997. Patnaik died on 24 December 2021, at the age of 81 at his home in Bhubaneswar.

References

1940 births
2021 deaths
State cabinet ministers of Odisha
People from Ganjam district
Leaders of the Opposition in Odisha
Janata Dal politicians
Biju Janata Dal politicians
Janata Party politicians
Indian National Congress politicians from Odisha
Bharatiya Janata Party politicians from Odisha
Odisha MLAs 1977–1980
Odisha MLAs 1980–1985
Odisha MLAs 1995–2000
Odisha MLAs 2000–2004